Meymun Darreh (also Romanized as Meymūn Darreh; also known as Mehmāndār, Mehmāndarreh, Mihmūndar, and Mikhmundar) is a village in Abharrud Rural District, in the Central District of Abhar County, Zanjan Province, Iran. At the 2006 census, its population was 1,028, in 252 families.

References 

Populated places in Abhar County